The Fisher FP-505 Skeeter is a Canadian single-seat, conventional landing gear, single-engined parasol-wing monoplane kit aircraft designed for construction by amateur builders. Fisher Flying Products was originally based in Edgeley, North Dakota, USA but the company is now located in Woodbridge, Ontario, Canada.

Development
The FP-505 was designed by Fisher Aircraft in the United States in 1984 and was intended to comply with the US FAR 103 Ultralight Vehicles category, with the category's maximum  empty weight. The 505's standard empty weight is  when equipped with a two-stroke  Rotax 277 engine. The design goal was to provide a nostalgic 1930s-style parasol similar in configuration to the Pietenpol Air Camper or Heath Parasol that would be easy to fly, with a high wing and an open cockpit.

The construction of the FP-505 is of wood, with the fuselage built from wood strips arranged in a geodesic form, resulting in a very strong and light aircraft with redundant load paths. The wings, tail and fuselage are covered with doped aircraft fabric. The wings are strut-braced with both jury struts and cabane struts. The aircraft has no flaps. The conventional-configuration landing gear is bungee suspended. The company claims it takes an amateur builder 500 hours to build the FP-505.

Early versions of the FP-505 were equipped with the  Rotax 277, and the aircraft reportedly flies well on that minimum power. Since the Rotax 277 is no longer in production, the  Hirth F-33 is specified along with the  Rotax 447 and  Rotax 503 engines.

By late 2011 over 45 FP-505s were flying.

Specifications (FP-505)

See also

References

External links
Official website
Photo of FP-505 Skeeter

1980s Canadian ultralight aircraft
Parasol-wing aircraft
Aircraft first flown in 1984